Rolf Fredrik Skoglund (11 August 1940 – 28 June 2022) was a Swedish actor. He won the Eugene O'Neill Award in 2007.

References

External links 
 Rolf Skoglund on Swedish Film Database
 
 Rolf Skoglund, Dramaten

1940 births
2022 deaths
Swedish stage actors
Male actors from Stockholm
Eugene O'Neill Award winners
20th-century Swedish male actors
21st-century Swedish male actors